Plays Metallica by Four Cellos is the debut album by Finnish metal band Apocalyptica, released in 1996. It features eight instrumental Metallica covers arranged and played on cellos.

The band was invited to record this album by a label employee after a 1995 show in which they performed some of the songs. The members were initially unsure and thought nobody would listen to such a record, but the employee insisted and they recorded it. On 22 July 2016, a remastered version of the album was released with new bonus tracks. In 2017 to 2019, the band returned as a cello quartet for the first time since 2009 to perform all the Metallica tracks they have covered to celebrate their 20th anniversary of the debut album. In late 2018, a live recording was released in CD, vinyl, and DVD with live footage entitled Plays Metallica by Four Cellos - A Live Performance.

Track listing

Certifications

References

Apocalyptica albums
1996 albums
Metallica tribute albums
Mercury Records albums